Tropical timber may refer to any type of timber or wood that grows in tropical rainforests and tropical and subtropical moist broadleaf forests and is harvested there. Typical examples of worldwide industrial significance include, among others, the following hardwoods:
Mahogany
Teak
Ebony
Rosewood
Narra
Chloroxylon

Overexploitation of those woods has led to widespread deforestation in the tropics. The intergovernmental organization International Tropical Timber Organization is concerned with conservation of the habitats of tropical timber trees.

See also

 International Tropical Timber Agreement, 2006
 Tropical Timber 94
 Tropical Timber 83
 Tropical Forest Trust
 Forest Stewardship Council
 CITES
 tropical forest
 forestry
 Plant Resources of Tropical Africa

References

Forestry
Timber industry
Tropical and subtropical moist broadleaf forests